Siniša Glavašević (4 November 1960 – 20 November 1991) was a Croatian reporter who was killed by Serbian paramilitaries following the Battle of Vukovar.

Early life
A native of Vukovar, Glavašević finished primary school there and entered the University of Sarajevo, where he graduated with a degree in Comparative Literature. During the Croatian War of Independence, he was chief editor of Radio Vukovar.

War
During the Battle of Vukovar, Glavašević was regularly reporting from the besieged city. He is particularly remembered for a series of stories he had read to the listeners, that talked about basic human values. On 16 October 1991, Glavašević said on Croatian Radio:

On 18 November 1991, Glavašević sent in his last report, which ended with:

Death

Glavašević disappeared shortly after this last report. He had been beaten and executed by Serbian paramilitary forces, along with hundreds of others between 18–20 November. In 1997, his body was exhumed from a mass grave in a nearby farm in Ovčara. He was 31 years old. Both Glavašević and fellow journalist , a native of Ovčara, were featured cases in Amnesty International's 1993-94 Campaign Against Disappearances and Political Killings. Polovina’s funeral was held in Zagreb on 11 March 1997.

Legacy
In 1992, Matica hrvatska printed Stories from Vukovar, a collection of stories by Glavašević. English translation of the collection was published in 2011.

See also
 List of journalists killed in Europe

References

1960 births
1991 deaths
People from Vukovar
Assassinated Croatian journalists
Civilians killed in the Croatian War of Independence
Journalists killed while covering the Yugoslav Wars
People murdered in Croatia
Deaths by firearm in Croatia
University of Sarajevo alumni
Burials at Mirogoj Cemetery
20th-century journalists